Gary Richard Christenson (born May 5, 1953) is a former Major League Baseball pitcher who played for two seasons. He pitched in six games for the Kansas City Royals during the 1979 season and in 24 games during the 1980 season. Christenson  finished his major league baseball career undefeated (3-0) and on April 13, 1980, he picked up his lone MLB save. He retired the final batter of the game to preserve a 3-2 Royals victory over the Tigers. He is the father of Ryan, Allan, and Carolyn Christenson.

References

External links
, or Retrosheet, or Venezuelan Winter League

1953 births
Living people
Baseball players from New York (state)
Bristol Tigers players
Charleston Charlies players
Clinton Pilots players
Evansville Triplets players
Jacksonville Suns players
Kansas City Royals players
Lakeland Tigers players
Major League Baseball pitchers
Montclair State Red Hawks baseball players
Montgomery Rebels players
Omaha Royals players
People from Mineola, New York
Tiburones de La Guaira players
American expatriate baseball players in Venezuela